Sphingonaepiopsis ansorgei is a moth of the family Sphingidae. It is known from open habitats from northern South Africa to East Africa in the east and to Angola in the west.

The length of the forewings is 14–15 mm. The ground colour of the body and forewings is reddish. Dark spots are absent, but replaced by a broad, rather diffuse diagonal band. The hindwings are uniform reddish.

References

Sphingonaepiopsis
Moths described in 1904
Moths of Africa
Insects of Angola
Fauna of Zambia
Taxa named by Walter Rothschild